Pottassery may refer to

Pottassery-I, a village in Kozhikode_district, Kerala, India
Pottassery-II, a village in Palakkad_district, Kerala, India